William Leisaw (sometimes incorrectly written Liesaw; October 24, 1875 – April 15, 1941) was an American race car driver who competed in the second and third Indianapolis 500 races in 1912 and 1913, driving a Buick.

Biography
Billy Leisaw was born October 24, 1875 in Vassar, Michigan, the son of John and Margaret Mcclain.  He married Ella Monroe on September 18, 1895 in Vassar.

He worked as district sales manager at Miller - Judd Electrical Co. in 1918 in Detroit Michigan. He was an automobile dealer for almost all his working life.

He committed suicide in Columbiaville, Michigan on April 15, 1941.

Indy 500 results

References

1875 births
1941 deaths
Indianapolis 500 drivers
People from Vassar, Michigan
Racing drivers from Michigan